The Castle in the South is a 1933 German comedy film directed by Géza von Bolváry and starring Liane Haid, Viktor de Kowa, and Paul Kemp. On a film shooting in the Adriatic, an actress falls for a film extra who turns out to be a Prince. A separate French-language version Château de rêve was also produced and released by UFA's French subsidiary. It was made at the Tempelhof Studios in Berlin while Location shooting took place in Dalmatia and at Rügen in Pomerania. The film's sets were designed by the art director Emil Hasler.

Cast

References

Bibliography 
 
 Klaus, Ulrich J. Deutsche Tonfilme: Jahrgang 1933. Klaus-Archiv, 1988.

External links 
 

1933 films
1933 comedy films
German comedy films
Films of Nazi Germany
1930s German-language films
Films directed by Géza von Bolváry
UFA GmbH films
German multilingual films
Films about filmmaking
German black-and-white films
1933 multilingual films
1930s German films
Films shot at Tempelhof Studios